"Lost Weekend" is a song by British band Lloyd Cole and the Commotions, released in 1985 as the second single from their second studio album Easy Pieces. The song was written by band members Neil Clark, Lloyd Cole and Lawrence Donegan, and produced by Clive Langer and Alan Winstanley. It peaked at number 17 in the UK Singles Chart and remained in the top 75 for seven weeks.

Background
Cole was inspired to write the lyrics to "Lost Weekend" after he fell ill during a visit to Amsterdam. He told The Mouth Magazine in 2020, "As I remember it, I was going over to sort of rendezvous there with my girlfriend of the time. I got ill, properly ill and was confined to hotel quarters."

Speaking of the influence that Iggy Pop's 1977 song "The Passenger" had on "Lost Weekend", Cole recalled in 2010, "It just went that way in rehearsal and while we were aware that the rhythm part was the same, the chords and everything else was different, so we weren't bothered. Gosh, I wish it owed more – 'The Passenger' is a fantastic track, 'Lost Weekend', to my ear, is a decent tune done overly quirkily."

Critical reception
Upon its release as a single, Tom Hibbert of Smash Hits commented, "This is lovely – chiming guitars sturdily jaunting and winking at an idea based on Iggy Pop's 'The Passenger' with customary jumbly vocal delivery". He added, "It all sounds uncharacteristically merry until one starts to pick up the words which appear to be about contracting pneumonia in Amsterdam, almost dying and then undergoing a religious conversion." Mat Snow of NME described it as "an agreeable piece of fluff worth at least five plays, if only to spot the 'influence', in this case Iggy's 'The Passenger'".

Dave Ling of Number One felt the song is "forgettably pleasant in a whimsical sort of way" and noted that "a fair amount of thought has been put into the lyrics", but added "it's not the sort of record I'd want to be subjected to more than once". Mike Mitchell of Record Mirror was critical, stating there's "too much jingle [and] not enough song".

Track listing
7–inch single (UK, Europe and Australasia)
"Lost Weekend" – 3:14
"Big World" – 2:18

10-inch limited edition single (UK)
"Lost Weekend" (Extended Version) – 4:19
"Big World" – 2:18
"Lost Weekend" (7" Version) – 3:14

12-inch single (UK, Europe and Australasia)
"Lost Weekend" (Extended Version) – 4:19
"Big World" – 2:18
"Nevers End" – 2:32
"Lost Weekend" (7" Version) – 3:14

Personnel
Lloyd Cole and the Commotions
 Lloyd Cole – vocals, guitar
 Neil Clark – guitar
 Blair Cowan – keyboards
 Lawrence Donegan – bass
 Stephen Irvine – drums

Additional musicians on "Lost Weekend"
 Jimmy Thomas – backing vocals
 Jimmy Chamberland – backing vocals
 Tony Jackson – backing vocals
 Gary Barnacle – brass
 Anne Dudley – string arrangement

Production
 Clive Langer – producer ("Lost Weekend")
 Alan Winstanley – producer ("Lost Weekend")
 Mark Saunders – producer ("Big World", "Nevers End")
 The Commotions – producers ("Big World", "Nevers End")

Other
 Peter Anderson – sleeve
 Clare Cameron – sleeve
 Green Ink – creative assistance

Charts

References

1985 songs
1985 singles
Lloyd Cole songs
Songs written by Neil Clark (musician)
Songs written by Lloyd Cole
Song recordings produced by Clive Langer
Song recordings produced by Alan Winstanley
Polydor Records singles